Morwyn Brebner is a Welsh playwright, television writer and producer, best known as creator and producer of the television series Rookie Blue and Saving Hope.

Born in Cardiff, Wales and raised in Ottawa, Ontario, Brebner is a graduate of the National Theatre School of Canada. Her first play, Music for Contortionist, premiered at Tarragon Theatre in 2000 and was a shortlisted nominee for the Dora Mavor Moore Award for Outstanding New Play. Her subsequent plays have included Liquor Guns Karate; Little Mercy's First Murder, which won six Dora Awards, including Outstanding New Musical; The Optimists, which was a shortlisted finalist for the Governor General's Award for English-language drama in 2006; Love Among the Russians; The President; and Heartbreaker. She was the English translator of Évelyne de la Chenelière's plays Strawberries in January (Des fraises en janvier), Bashir Lazhar and Public Disorder (Désordre public), and of Serge Boucher's Motel Hélène.

She remained playwright-in-residence at Tarragon until 2012.

As a television writer her credits have included episodes of The Eleventh Hour, At the Hotel, Moose TV, King, Rookie Blue, Saving Hope, Bellevue and Coroner, and she was executive producer of Rookie Blue, Saving Hope, Bellevue and Coroner.

She is married to playwright Michael Healey.

References

External links

21st-century Canadian dramatists and playwrights
Canadian women dramatists and playwrights
Canadian television writers
Canadian television producers
Canadian women television producers
Writers from Ottawa
Welsh emigrants to Canada
Living people
National Theatre School of Canada alumni
Canadian women non-fiction writers
21st-century Canadian women writers
Canadian women television writers
Year of birth missing (living people)
21st-century Canadian screenwriters
21st-century Canadian translators